The Welsh dance, also known as the Welsh folk dance, is a traditional dance in Wales, performed to Welsh traditional music and while usually wearing a traditional Welsh costume.

Today 
Welsh dancing is an integral part of both the local and national eisteddfod tradition in Wales. Welsh dancing has become an integral part of the eisteddfodau and dancing tradition. Notable dancing groups include Nantgarw Dancers hailing from the Pontypridd area and Talog dancers from Carmarthen. Both groups have enjoyed significant success in National Eisteddfod competitions. Nantgarw dancers have also had significant success in international competitions such as the Llangollen International Eisteddfod in Wales, Lorient Folk Festival in France and Mallorca World Folk Festival in Spain.

History

Lois Blake 
Following the religious revival's devastating effect on dancing in Wales, there was an increased desire for national expression via the means of dance. Lois Blake collected remnants of the Welsh dance tradition in her publication "Welsh Folk Dance", published 1948.

William Jones 
Williams Jones corresponded with the Gwyneddigion Society, and with other contemporary men of letters, and began collecting and recording local folk songs and country dances for Edward Jones (Bardd y Brenin), the King's Bard. Jones spent much time conversing with the elderly members of the community as well as researching manuscripts and printed collections which provided Edward Jones with valuable material for his printed volumes. He describes many of the dances as having "sharp twists and turns rendering them fiendishly difficult to perform well", and stated that they were probably "too fatiguing for the bodies and minds of the present generation, and requiring much skill and activity in the performance".

Nantgarw dance tradition 
The Nantgarw dance tradition is a style of Welsh folk dancing from the South and Valleys regions of Wales, specifically associated with the small village of Nantgarw. The style encompasses both handkerchief and stick dances. The dances call for eight dancers in four pairs. The style was first put into dance notation by Dr. Ceinwen Thomas (1911-2008) who wrote down what her mother, Catherine Margretta Thomas, could remember of the dances that had been danced locally when she was young. The Nantgarw dances take their name from the village of Nantgarw in the county borough of Rhondda Cynon Taf where they are said to have first been performed.

Catherine Margretta Thomas 
Catherine Margretta Thomas was born in 1880 in the village of Nantgarw. Her parents were Daniel and Hannah Davies. As a child she enjoyed watching the local dances as they were performed in an open space below Twyn Chapel in Caerphilly and at Nantgarw and Y Groes Wen. Due to the hostility of the local churches to folk dancing, Catherine Margretta Thomas' own mother was not keen on her daughter going to see these dances, but Catherine was able to convince her father to take her along to witness the displays. The rise of Nonconformism in Wales meant that by the time Catherine Margretta Thomas was in her teens folk dancing had practically been eradicated in Nantgarw.

Welsh Folk Dance Society 

Dancing had died hard if inconsistently by 1911 when Catherine Margretta Thomas' daughter, Ceinwen Thomas (later Dr. Ceinwen Thomas), was born. But the influence of Nonconformism waned and by the time Ceinwen Thomas was attending school she was discussing the tradition of dancing in Nantgarw with her mother. After Ceinwen Thomas had left college she met Walter Dowding of the Welsh National Folk Dance Society. She told him about her mother's recollections of folk dancing in Nantgarw. He put her in touch with Doris Freeman. Together Catherine Margretta Thomas, Ceinwen Thomas and Doris Freeman worked to notate the dance steps from the traditional dances that Catherine Margretta Thomas could remember. These notes were then passed on to the Welsh National Folk Dance Society by Ceinwen Thomas.

References 

Welsh culture
Welsh traditions